24 Horas may refer to:

 24 horas (Chile), a Chilean newscast
 24 Horas (Colombian TV program), broadcast by the programadora 24 Hours
 24 Horas (Mexican TV program), broadcast by Televisa
 24 Horas (Spanish TV channel), broadcast by TVE

See also 
 24 Oras, a Filipino newscast